Xue Dubi (1892-July 9, 1973) was a politician of the Republic of China and the People's Republic of China. He was born in Yuncheng, Shanxi. In 1911, at the age of 19, he joined the Tongmenghui. He was the 10th Republic-era mayor of Beijing as part of the Beiyang government. He later went over to the Kuomintang and served in the various positions in the Nationalist government in both Nanjing and Chongqing. After the creation of the People's Republic, Xue chose to remain in the mainland. He died in Shanghai at the age of 82.

Bibliography
 
 
1892 births
1973 deaths
People's Republic of China politicians from Shanxi
Tongmenghui members
Mayors of Beijing
Politicians from Yuncheng
Republic of China politicians from Shanxi